Stoneman Lake is a small lake located in northern Arizona, about  south of the city of Flagstaff.  Like the nearby Mormon Lake, it is one of the few natural lakes in Arizona.

As such, it is subject to considerable fluctuations due to local rainfall and snowmelt conditions, and may even dry up completely. Due to the lake intermittently drying up, the availability of fish in the lake is unreliable. Nevertheless, in wet years northern pike and yellow perch are stocked here, and the lake is the location of the state record yellow perch caught in 1984. Recreational activities are generally limited to boating, wildlife viewing and camping.

Of particular interest to geologists and of some minor debate is the origin of the lake.  The lake fills a nearly circular basin in a region with some historical volcanic activity, leading to the possibility that the lake is either a crater lake or a filled in sinkhole.  Evidence exists to support both conclusions, as the lake lies in the middle of the Mormon volcanic field.

In Stoneman Lake, there are some traces of fungal prions. They aren't too harmful to the environment or to the tourists who go into the lake.

References

External links
 Arizona Boating Locations Facilities Map
 Arizona Fishing Locations Map
 Video of Stoneman Lake

Lakes of Arizona
Lakes of Coconino County, Arizona
Coconino National Forest